John Robert Borton (December 14, 1932 – April 8, 2002) was an American football quarterback in the National Football League (NFL) who played for the Cleveland Browns. He played college football for the Ohio State Buckeyes.

Borton died in 2002.

References

External links
John Borton Pro-Football-Reference.com Retrieved 2019-03-17.

1932 births
2002 deaths
American football quarterbacks
Cleveland Browns players
Ohio State Buckeyes football players